Warburg is a village in central Alberta, Canada. The village is named for Varberg Fortress in Sweden. The fortress's name was once spelled Warberg in English, but a spelling error resulted in the name Warburg.

Demographics 

In the 2016 Census of Population conducted by Statistics Canada, the Village of Warburg recorded a population of 766 living in 302 of its 335 total private dwellings, a  change from its 2011 population of 789.

Economy 
The village of Warburg is a member of the Leduc-Nisku Economic Development Association, an economic development partnership that markets Alberta's International Region in proximity to the Edmonton International Airport.

See also 
List of communities in Alberta
List of villages in Alberta

References

External links 

1953 establishments in Alberta
Edmonton Metropolitan Region
Leduc County
Villages in Alberta